Kim Bo-hye is a South Korean taekwondo practitioner.

She won a gold medal in bantamweight at the 2005 World Taekwondo Championships in Madrid. She won a gold medal at the 2006 Asian Games.

References

External links

Year of birth missing (living people)
Living people
South Korean female taekwondo practitioners
Taekwondo practitioners at the 2006 Asian Games
Asian Games medalists in taekwondo
Medalists at the 2006 Asian Games
Asian Games gold medalists for South Korea
World Taekwondo Championships medalists
21st-century South Korean women